Pran most often refers to , the concept of a "life force" in Hindu philosophy.

Pran may also refer to:

People
Pran Kishore Kaul, Kashmiri actor
Pran Nath Lekhi (1924/1925–2010), Indian lawyer
Pran Nath (musician) (1918–1996), Hindustani classical singer
Pran Nath (physicist) (born 1939), Kashmiri American physicist
Pran Nevile (1922–2018), Indian writer
Pran Kumar Sharma (1938–2014), commonly known as Pran, Indian cartoonist
Pran (actor) (1920–2013), born Pran Krishan Sikand, Indian film actor
Pran Nath Thapar (1906–1975), Indian military commander
Dith Pran (1942–2008), Cambodian photojournalist, subject of The Killing Fields

Places
Pranburi (disambiguation), several places in Thailand
Pran Buri District, district in Prachuap Khiri Khan Province, Thailand

Other
PRAN-RFL Group, a Bangladeshi food-products corporation
PRAN, largest processors of fruits and vegetables in Bangladesh
Pran Cola, cola soft drink manufactured by Pran Group in Bangladesh
Pran of Albania, 1929 novel by Elizabeth Miller